Baseball Bugs is a 1946 Warner Bros. Looney Tunes theatrical animated cartoon directed by Friz Freleng. The short was released on February 2, 1946, and stars Bugs Bunny.

In the short, Bugs Bunny singlehandedly defeats the "Gas-House Gorillas", a baseball team of hulking, cigar-chomping bullies. The cartoon has been called Bugs "at his best" and is still referenced by baseball fans and observers.

Overview
Baseball Bugs is directed by Friz Freleng and written by Michael Maltese. Voice characterizations were performed by Mel Blanc, with additional uncredited performances by Bea Benaderet as Lady Liberty, and Tedd Pierce as the stadium announcer and several of the Gas-House Gorillas.

The cartoon's title is a double play on words. "Bugs" was then a common nickname for someone who was considered to be crazy, erratic, or fanatical. In addition to its adjective form being the indirect inspiration for the Bunny's name, the noun form was sometimes applied to sports fans.

Plot
A baseball game is going on in New York City at the Polo Grounds (but the depiction of the frieze on the top deck was borrowed from Yankee Stadium), between the visiting Gas-House Gorillas (a parody of the real life Gashouse Gang which was the nickname of the St. Louis Cardinals teams of the early 1930s who were known for their shabby and unkempt appearance) and the home team, the Tea Totallers. The game is not going well for the home team as the Gorillas, a group of oversized rough-necks, are not only dominating the Tea Totallers, a team made up of just one elderly player, but intimidating the umpire by knocking him into the ground like a tent peg after he makes a "ball" judgment instead of a "strike". The Gorillas' home runs go screaming, literally, out of the ballpark and the batters form a conga line, each hitter whacking a ball out.

Bugs Bunny, watching from his hole in the outfield, is fed up with the unfair game and the Gas-House Gorillas playing dirty. He talks trash against the Gorillas, claiming that he could win the game single-handedly with an endless barrage of home runs. He loses a bit of his bravado when he suddenly gets surrounded by the Gorillas. They force him to take up his own challenge and, as a result, Bugs now has to play all the positions on the opposing team, including speeding from the mound to behind the plate to catch his own pitches.

Bugs throws his fastball so hard that it zips by the Gorillas' batter but, as he catches it, he is propelled off-screen, crashing into the backstop. In the course of his dual role, he shouts encouraging words to the pitcher before going back to the mound to make the next pitch, then returning to home plate to catch it. Next, Bugs decides to "perplex 'em with [his] slowball", throwing a pitch so slow that three Gorillas in a row strike out attempting to hit it.

For his first time up, Bugs selects a bat from the batboy, a literal hybrid of a bat and a boy. As promised, Bugs starts smacking the ball. On the first pitch, he makes a long hit, dashing around the bases while also showing off for the crowd, only to find a grinning Gorilla holding the ball just ahead of home plate, just waiting to tag him out to once again prove their superiority. To allow himself to score his first run, Bugs pulls out a pin-up poster, which distracts the Gorilla player. The scoreboard now shows the Gorillas as the home team, with 96 runs, and Bugs batting in the top of the fifth with one run so far.

Bugs hits another one deep, and while rounding the bases, a Gorilla ambushes the plate umpire and puts on his uniform. Bugs slides into home, obviously safe, but the fake umpire calls him out. Bugs gets in his face, actually behind the umpire mask, and argues the call, pulling his time-honored word-switching gag until the umpire ends up demanding that Bugs accept the safe call or go to the showers. Bugs gives in, and the faux-umpire gets wise too late as the board flashes another run.

Bugs slams a third pitch, and as the ball soars across the field, one Gorilla in the outfield races towards the ball with his mitt, screaming, "I got it, I got it, I got it!, only for the ball to hit him with an incredibly strong impact and drive him underground; a gravestone then pops up from underground, reading "He got it". Bugs then whacks the fourth pitch, and a burly, cigar-smoking Gorilla attempts to catch it, but the ball strikes him in the face - with the powerful impact sending him backward and smack into a large wooden sign, which reads, "Does your tobacco taste different lately?".

Bugs hammers the fifth pitch on a line drive that bounces off each Gorilla with a ping sound as in a pinball game. The scoreboard then blinks a random series of numbers and the word "Tilt."

Bugs returns to pitching, and one Gorilla lands a hit. Just before he can score a home run, Bugs, with one foot on the home plate, shoves him to the ground with baseball in hand, tagging him out. As the dazed, concussed Gorilla sits there with four small illusionary winged Gorilla players swirling around his head, Bugs munches a carrot and pulls out a sign reading "Was this trip really necessary?" (a reference to a slogan used in a fuel rationing campaign during World War II).

The story jumps ahead to the final inning, announced by a radio-style jingle, with Bugs leading 96–95, both sides having each lost a run somewhere along the way, and with the Gorillas now the home team. Blanc's voice is now heard as the announcer as the radio booth has lost its original play-by-play man. With two outs in the last of the ninth, a Gorilla is on base and another, menacingly swinging a bat he has just fashioned from a huge tree, is ready for the pitch.

Bugs proceeds with a tremendous wind-up, lets the pitch go, and the ball is rocketed out of the stadium. Startled, Bugs desperately gives chase. He grabs a cab and is almost led astray until he realizes a Gorilla is driving it; he jumps out and catches a bus which takes him to the "Umpire State Building". He takes an elevator to the roof, climbs a flagpole, throws his glove in the air and manages to catch the ball. An umpire appears over the edge of the roof, and calls out the Gorilla player who has followed Bugs there. The Statue of Liberty comes to life to agree with the call, repeating, "That's what the man said–you heard what he said–he said that!". Bugs also joins her in repeating these words.

The plot was reused in Gone Batty (1954), with some sequences being shot-for-shot quotes.

Voice cast
 Mel Blanc as Bugs Bunny, Grandpa-Baseball, Gas-House Gorilla
 Frank Graham as Commentator, Gas-House Gorilla
 Tedd Pierce as Announcer-Radio, Umpire
 Bea Benaderet as Statue of Liberty

Billboards
 The outfield wall ad for "Mike Maltese, Ace Detective" refers to writer Michael Maltese.
 The outfield wall ad for "Filboid Studge" refers to a fictional breakfast cereal mentioned in a short story by Saki.
 The ad next to "Filboid Studge" is for "Culvert Gin", a take-off on "Calvert Gin."
 The wall ads on the third base side are for "Manza Champagne", "Lausbub's Bread" and "Ross. Co. Finer Footwear for the Brats" named for animator Virgil Ross.
 The ads on the left field wall are for Camuel's (a reference to Camel Cigarettes) and "Urbo."
 Another outfield reading "Daltol" refers to animator Cal Dalton. A product named "Chi-Chi" is on a sign to the left.
 The sign held by Bugs after the 2nd out stating "Was this trip really necessary?" refers to gas rationing during World War II.

Analysis
 Animation historian Michael Barrier points out that there was a change in formula in Bugs' cartoons before and following World War II. Before his enemies were hapless boobs which he held in contempt. In this film and others by Freleng, the enemies are actually dangerous. But this makes outwitting them more delicious. In this case, the enemies are the Gas-House Gorillas. "A whole team of interchangeable ... hulking, blue-jawed, cigar chewing monsters".
 Bugs launches a fastball from the pitcher's mound, accelerates past it, and moves in position at home plate to catch it. This is a demonstration of cartoon physics, since such acceleration would be impossible in real life.
 The sequence where Bugs throws a pitch so slowly that three batters strike out swinging on the same pitch inspired the term "Bugs Bunny Change-Up" in baseball slang. The term refers to an especially effective off-speed pitch, especially one that is much slower than the pitcher's fastball. It is also known as an "Eephus pitch".

Home media
 (1988) VHS - Cartoon Moviestars: Bugs!
 (1988) LaserDisc - Cartoon Moviestars: Bugs! and Elmer!
 (1992) LaserDisc - The Golden Age of Looney Tunes, Volume 3, Side 7
 (1999) VHS - Looney Tunes: The Collectors Edition Volume 9, A Looney Life (1995 USA Turner Dubbed Version)
 (2003) DVD - Looney Tunes Golden Collection: Volume 1, Disc One
 (2010) DVD - The Essential Bugs Bunny, Disc 1
 (2011) Blu-ray, DVD - Looney Tunes Platinum Collection: Volume 1, Disc 1
 (2012) Blu-ray - Looney Tunes Showcase: Volume 1
 (2020) DVD - Looney Tunes Bugs Bunny Golden Carrot Collection, Disc One
 (2020) Blu-ray - Bugs Bunny 80th Anniversary Collection, Disc 1

See also
 List of Bugs Bunny cartoons
 Looney Tunes and Merrie Melodies filmography (1940–1949)

Sources

References

External links

 
 
 A mock-serious and detailed review of the cartoon
 Baseball Bugs on the Internet Archive

1946 short films
1946 animated films
1940s sports comedy films
Looney Tunes shorts
Warner Bros. Cartoons animated short films
Short films directed by Friz Freleng
American baseball films
Animated films set in New York City
Baseball animation
Animated films about rabbits and hares
Bugs Bunny films
Films with screenplays by Michael Maltese
1940s Warner Bros. animated short films
Films scored by Carl Stalling
1940s English-language films
American comedy short films